Dictyonema barbatum is a species of basidiolichen in the family Hygrophoraceae. It is endemic to the Galápagos Islands, where it grows as an epiphyte on the bark of branches and trunks, often on introduced plants such as avocado and guava trees. It was formally described as a new species in 2017 by Manuela Dal-Forno, Frank Bungartz, and Robert Lücking. Its preferred habitat is open areas with lots of rainfall and light exposure. The specific epithet barbatum refers to the "beard-like" white hairs on the shelf margins, a characteristic feature of this species. These "hairs" are sheaths of fungal hyphae that lack photobiont filaments.

References

barbatum
Lichen species
Lichens described in 2017
Lichens of the Galápagos Islands
Taxa named by Robert Lücking
Basidiolichens